Dyrlægens natmad ("veterinarian's night food") is the Danish name for a smørrebrød, also known as an open-faced sandwich, made with a particular selection of toppings. The name of this snack originated in the 1920s in Oskar Davidsen's sandwich bread restaurant in Copenhagen. According to food historian Nina Bauer the famous sandwich is named after one of the restaurant's regulars, a distinguished veterinarian named Sigurd Kejlgaard, who was employed to look after the horses in the royal stables and the contemporary Circus Miehe.  

The simplest form of Dyrlægens natmad consists of a slice of rugbrød with a base spread of butter or fat, a layer of leverpostej, sliced salt beef, meat stock aspic and red onion rings on top.

See also 
Danish cuisine

References 

Danish cuisine
Beef sandwiches
Open-faced sandwiches
Rye-based dishes